Terra Brava (Wild Land) is a Portuguese telenovela which began airing on SIC in October 28, 2019 and ended in March 7, 2021.

Plot 
In Wild Land, we follow the struggle of Diogo, a decorated military, who returns to his homeland to bring justice to Eduarda, who has destroyed his life and family in the past. But he will not have an easy time when he deeply falls in love with Beatriz, the daughter of the woman that he wants to destroy.

On top of that, he finds out Beatriz is married with the obsessed Tiago, his biological younger brother and the only remaining family.
How will this interfere with his plans?

A story of revenge, a matriarch determined to keep the past away, a sick love and two brothers fighting for the same woman.
The once quiet land, Vila Brava, is now on fire!

Cast

Special Guest Cast

References

External links

2019 Portuguese television series debuts
2021 Portuguese television series endings
Portuguese telenovelas
2019 telenovelas
Sociedade Independente de Comunicação telenovelas
Portuguese-language telenovelas